Ellice (or Ellis, or Ellise) was launched in 1798 in Bermuda. From 1800 to her loss she was a hired transport for the government, carrying passengers and cargo between London and the Mediterranean, sailing as far as Malta. She was wrecked in November 1817.

Career
Ellice entered Lloyd's Register (LR) in 1800 with J.Dryden, master, Mellish & Co, owner, and trade London transport. She had damages repaired in 1800.

Fate
The transport ship Ellice was wrecked on 1 November 1817 on the north coast of Spain. By one report, one hundred and forty-four passengers and the rest of the crew were rescued. LLoyd's List reported that the wreck took place on 5 November and that an officer to the 60th Regiment and about 30 others were drowned.

Citations

1798 ships
Age of Sail merchant ships of England
Maritime incidents in 1817